The Sanremo Music Festival 2018 was the 68th annual Sanremo Music Festival, a television song contest held in the Teatro Ariston of Sanremo and organised and broadcast by RAI.

Format

Presenters

Singer-songwriter and musician, Claudio Baglioni, was the main host and artistic director of Sanremo Music Festival 2018, alongside co-hosts Michelle Hunziker and Pierfrancesco Favino.

Voting
Voting during the five evenings occurred through different combinations of four methods:
 Public televoting, carried out via landline, mobile phone, the contest's official mobile app, and online voting.
 Press jury voting, expressed by accredited journalists that followed the competition from the Roof Hall at the Teatro Ariston.
 A demoscopic poll, composed of a sample of 300 music fans, which voted from their homes via an electronic voting system managed by Ipsos.
 Expert jury voting, resulting from points assigned by personalities from the world of music, entertainment and culture. The jury is composed by Pino Donaggio (president), Giovanni Allevi, Serena Autieri, Milly Carlucci, Gabriele Muccino, Rocco Papaleo, Mirca Rosciani and Andrea Scanzi.

The three voting systems had a percentage weight so distributed:
 First, Second and Third Evening: 40% Public televoting; 30% Demoscopic poll; 30% Press jury voting
 Fourth and Fifth Evening: 50% Public televoting; 30% Press jury voting; 20% Expert jury voting
In the final part of the fifth evening, a new rank indicating the first three acts -determined by the percentage of votes obtained in this evening's vote and those obtained in previous evenings- was drawn up.

Selections

Newcomers' section
The artists competing in the Newcomers' section were selected through two separate contests: Sanremo Giovani and Area Sanremo.

Sanremo Giovani
On October 31, 2017, Rai Commission for Sanremo Music Festival 2018 announced a list of 650 acts, but only 68 artists coming from all Italian regions -excluding Basilicata and Valle d'Aosta- and from abroad were selected in the first phase.

On November 10, 2017, Rai Commission announced the sixteen finalists.

Group 1
 Santiago – "Nessuno" (eliminated)
 Lorenzo Baglioni – "Il congiuntivo"
 Nyvinne – "Spreco personale" 
 Dave Monaco – "L'eternità è di chi sa volare" (eliminated)
Group 2
 Mirkoeilcane – "Stiamo tutti bene"
 Luchi – "Gli amori della mente" (eliminated)
 Eva – "Cosa ti salverà"
 Iosonoaria – "Un cerchio" (eliminated)

Group 3
 Giulia Casieri – "Come stai"
 Davide Petrella – "Non può far male" (eliminated)
 Jose Nunes – "Parlami ancora"  (eliminated)
 Antonia Laganà – "Parli"
Group 4
 Mudimbi – "Il mago"
 Carol Beria – "Nessuna lacrima" (eliminated)
 Ultimo – "Il ballo delle incertezze"
 Aprile & Mangiaracina – "Quell'attimo di eternità" (eliminated)

On December 15, 2017, the sixteen finalists performed their songs at Villa Ormond in Sanremo, with the show Sarà Sanremo broadcast on Rai 1 presented by Claudia Gerini and Federico Russo. The six selected by the jury were added to the two entries of Area Sanremo, for a total of eight young emerging artists in the category of the Newcomers' section of the Sanremo Music Festival 2018. Lorenzo Baglioni, Mudimbi, Eva, Mirkoeilcane, Giulia Casieri and Ultimo were chosen as contestants of the Newcomers' section of the Sanremo Music Festival 2018.

Area Sanremo
After the auditions, RAI Commission -composed by Massimo Cotto, Stefano Senardi, Antonio Vandoni, Maurizio Caridi and Maurilio Giordana; plus the participation of Franco Zanetti and Amara- identified 8 finalists for the competition among the 145 acts:

 Martina Attili
 Alice Caioli
 Diego Esposito
 Manuel Foresta
 Andrea Maestrelli
 Leonardo Monteiro
 Giorgia Pino
 Daniele Ronda

Newcomers' Finalists 

 Lorenzo Baglioni - "Il congiuntivo" 
 Mirkoeilcane - "Stiamo tutti bene" 
 Eva - "Cosa ti salverà"
 Giulia Casieri - "Come stai" 
 Mudimbi - "Il mago"
 Ultimo - "Il ballo delle incertezze"
 Leonardo Monteiro - "Bianca"
 Alice Caioli - "Specchi rotti"

Big Artists section
The Big Artists section of the contest will revert to 20 artists, after briefly going up to 22 last year. Unlike in previous years, there will be no eliminations during the four weeknight shows. All the artists will perform several times and will be scored during the week, but they will all advance to the final night.

Competing entries

Shows

First evening
The 20 Big Artists each performed their song for the first time.

Second evening
The first ten Big Artists each performed their song again and the first four Newcomers each performed their song for the first time.

Big Artists

Newcomers

Third evening
The other ten Big Artists each performed their song for the second time and the other four Newcomers each performed their song for the first time.

Big Artists

Newcomers

Fourth evening
The 20 Big Artists performed their songs as duets and the eight Newcomers also performed their songs again.

Fifth evening
The 20 Big Artists will again each perform their entry for a final time. The top three will face a superfinal vote, then the winner of Sanremo 2018 will be decided.

Superfinal

Special guests
The special guests of Sanremo Music Festival 2018 were:

 Singers / musicians: Biagio Antonacci, Gianni Morandi, Gianna Nannini, Nek, Gino Paoli,   Laura Pausini, Max Pezzali, Piero Pelù, Danilo Rea, Francesco Renga, Shaggy, Sting, James Taylor.
 Bands / music groups: Il Volo, Negramaro.
 Actors / comedians / directors / models: Stefano Accorsi, Carolina Crescentini, Elena Cucci, Nino Frassica, Rosario Fiorello, Claudia Gerini, Massimo Ghini, Sabrina Impacciatore, Ivano Marescotti, Giulia Michelini, Giampaolo Morelli, Gabriele Muccino, Stefania Sandrelli, Valeria Solarino, Gianmarco Tognazzi.
 Other notable figures: Antonella Clerici, Pippo Baudo, Franca Leosini, Giorgio Panariello.

Related shows

Primafestival
Sergio Assisi and Melissa Greta Marchetto present Primafestival, a small show on air on Rai 1 immediately after TG1. The show features details, curiosities and news relating to Sanremo Music Festival 2018.

Dopofestival
Edoardo Leo and Carolina Di Domenico, with the participation of Sabrina Impacciatore, Rolando Ravello, Paolo Genovese, Rocco Tanica and a group of journalists of Italian press, presents ...tanto siamo tra amici al Dopofestival, a talk show on air on Rai 1 immediately after Sanremo Music Festival. The show features comments about the Festival as well as interviews to the singers competing in the song contest.

Broadcast and ratings

Local broadcast
Rai 1 and Rai Radio 2 are the official broadcasters of the festival in Italy. The show is also available in streaming via website on Rai Play.

Ratings Sanremo Music Festival 2018
The audience is referred to the one of Rai 1.

Ratings Prima Festival 2018

Ratings Dopo Festival 2018

International broadcast
The international television service Rai Italia broadcast the competition in the Americas, Africa, Asia and Australia.
The contest will be broadcast in Albania by RTSH and Russia by Vremya.
The contest is also visible via website on Eurovision.

Italy in the Eurovision Song Contest
The winners of the Big Artists category received the right to represent Italy at the Eurovision Song Contest 2018. However, winners are not obliged to take part in Eurovision, as seen in 2016 when Stadio declined to participate in the contest, which did not happen in this edition. In the event that the winner decides not to compete in the Eurovision Song Contest, RAI and the organisers of Sanremo Music Festival usually reserve the right to select the Italian entrant to themselves, in the case of 2016 selecting runner-up Francesca Michielin. 

There were several former Italian Eurovision representatives feature in the Big Artists category this year. Nina Zilli came 9th in 2012 with "L'amore è femmina (Out of love)". Riccardo Fogli came 11th in 1983 with "Per Lucia". Enrico Ruggeri, the lead singer of Decibel, came 12th in 1993 with "Sole d'Europa" and Luca Barbarossa also came 12th in 1988 with "Vivo (Ti scrivo)".

References

2018 in Italian television
2018 song contests
February 2018 events in Italy
Sanremo Music Festival by year